Alexander Pavlovich   Khavanov (Russian: Александр Павлович Хаванов, born January 30, 1972) is a former professional ice hockey defenceman who played in the NHL for the St. Louis Blues and Toronto Maple Leafs.

Career
Khavanov was drafted in the 8th round (232nd overall) by the St. Louis Blues in the 1999 NHL Entry Draft.

Khavanov scored two goals, including the game-tying goal with less than 30 seconds remaining in regulation, for the Blues in their victorious "Wednesday Night Miracle" game where the Blues were trailing 5-0 to the Toronto maple Leafs.

Khavanov left the NHL to play 2006 / 2007 season with HC Davos in Switzerland.

Jersey numbers
SKA Saint Petersburg – Number 3 (1993–1994)
SKA Saint Petersburg – Number 35 (1994–1996)
Severstal Cherepovets – Number 30 (1996–1998)
Dynamo Moscow – Number 21 (1998–2000)
St. Louis Blues – Number 29 (2000–2004)
SKA Saint Petersburg – Number 35 (2004–2005)
Toronto Maple Leafs – Number 25 (2005–2006)
Russian National Team – Number 4 (1998–2000)
Russian National Team – Number 29 (2002–2004)

Career statistics

Regular season and playoffs

International

References

External links

1972 births
Living people
Birmingham Bulls (ECHL) players
HC Davos players
HC Dynamo Moscow players
HPK players
Raleigh IceCaps players
Russian ice hockey defencemen
St. Louis Blues draft picks
St. Louis Blues players
Severstal Cherepovets players
SKA Saint Petersburg players
Ice hockey people from Moscow
Toronto Maple Leafs players
Russian sports journalists
Ice hockey commentators